The Suiko period  is a chronological timeframe during the Asuka period of Japanese history. This period overlaps all but 7 years of Empress Suiko's reign (604-628) or it is used as a synonym for her reign (593-628).

Calendar
The  adoption of the Sexagenary cycle calendar (Jikkan Jūnishi) was a significant event in the reign of Empress Suiko.

Events of the Suiko period
 604:  In the 12th year of Suiko's reign, Japan organized its earliest Imperial calendar, also known as the "Suiko period".
 628: In the 35th year of Suiko, the empress abdicated; and the period ended.

See also
 Regnal name
 List of Japanese era names

Notes

References
 Nussbaum, Louis-Frédéric and Käthe Roth. (2005).  Japan encyclopedia. Cambridge: Harvard University Press. ;  OCLC 58053128
 Titsingh, Isaac. (1834).  Annales des empereurs du Japon (Nihon Odai Ichiran).  Paris: Royal Asiatic Society, Oriental Translation Fund of Great Britain and Ireland. OCLC 5850691
 Tsuchihashi, Paul Yashita, S.J. (1952). .  Tokyo: Sophia University. OCLC 001291275
 Zöllner, Reinhard. (2003). Japanische Zeitrechnung: ein Handbuch Munich: Iudicium Verlag. ;  OCLC 249297777

External links
 National Diet Library, "The Japanese Calendar" -- historical overview plus illustrative images from library's collection

Japanese eras